Vincennes Township is one of ten townships in Knox County, Indiana. As of the 2010 census, its population was 23,707 and it contained 10,313 housing units.

Geography

References

External links
 Indiana Township Association
 United Township Association of Indiana

Townships in Knox County, Indiana
Townships in Indiana